Yellow Fog is a horror novel by Les Daniels.  It was first published in 1986 by Donald M. Grant, Publisher, Inc. in an edition of 800 copies which were signed by the author and slipcased.  The novel is part of the author's Don Sebastian series.  An expanded edition was published by Tor Books in 1988.

Plot introduction
The novel concerns the vampire Don Sebastian in Victorian England.

References

1986 American novels
American horror novels
American vampire novels
Novels set in England
Fiction set in the 19th century
Donald M. Grant, Publisher books